Grimmiaceae is a family of mosses in the order Grimmiales.

Genera
The Plant List and Tropicos list the following genera:

 Aligrimmia 
 Bucklandiella 
 Codriophorus 
 Coscinodon 
 Coscinodontella 
 Dryptodon 
 Gasterogrimmia 
 Grimmia 
 Guembelia 
 Indusiella 
 Jaffueliobryum 
 Leucoperichaetium 
 Niphotrichum 
 Orthogrimmia 
 Racomitrium 
 Schistidium 
 Scouleria 
 Streptocolea 
 Tridontium

Fossil record 
A fossil species, Tricarinella crassiphylla is known from the Early Cretaceous (Valanginian ~136 million years ago) Apple Bay flora on Vancouver Island, Canada, which is the oldest known member of the Dicranidae.

References

External links

Moss families
Grimmiales